The Hopetoun Blunder was a political event immediately prior to the Federation of the British colonies in Australia.

Federation was scheduled to occur on 1 January 1901, but since the general election for the first Parliament of Australia was not to be held until March, it was not possible to follow the conventions of the Westminster system and appoint the leader of the majority in the House of Representatives as Prime Minister. Instead, an interim government would be appointed, holding office from 1 January until the result of the election was known.

The first Governor-General of Australia was John Hope, 7th Earl of Hopetoun (who later became the 1st Marquess of Linlithgow). His initial task on arriving in Australia on 15 December 1900 was to appoint a Prime Minister to lead the interim government. Hopetoun had little knowledge of the Australian political scene and had no formal instructions from the Colonial Office. On 19 December, following the precedent of the Canadian Confederation, Hopetoun commissioned the Premier of the most populous colony to form a government. That state was New South Wales, and its premier was Sir William Lyne.

This was a controversial choice as Lyne had become premier in September 1899 only after the government of the more popular and experienced George Reid had lost its majority in the New South Wales Legislative Assembly. Lyne supported federation only at the last minute after long being a strong opponent and, as a result, he was unpopular with other leading colonial, pro-federation politicians including Edmund Barton and Alfred Deakin.   The Bulletin summed up many people's view when it editorialised, "Among the men who can claim by merit or accident, to be front-rank politicians of Australia, Lyne stands out conspicuously as almost the dullest and most ordinary".  However, there were those who supported the choice of Lyne, as Barton was at that time not a member of a parliament.

Despite significant efforts, Lyne was unable to persuade any other colonial politicians to join his government. In particular, Barton wrote to him, "If your object is to ask me to join you in a federal administration, it will be of little use for us to meet and discuss the matter. It would be a contradiction of my whole career in relation to federation if I served under a prime minister who had throughout opposed the adoption by the people of the measure of which he is now asked to the first constitutional guardian". Lyne returned his commission to Lord Hopetoun at 10 pm on 24 December. Alfred Deakin, among others, had now persuaded Hopetoun to commission Barton as Prime Minister if Lyne was not able to form a ministry. At 11 pm that evening, Barton was given Hopetoun's commission, and he was successful in forming a government, which took office on 1 January 1901. He appointed Lyne as his Minister for Home Affairs.

References

History of Australia (1851–1900)
Federalism in Australia
1900 in Australia
1900 in politics
Political controversies in Australia